Imran Khan  (born 19 November 1964) is a solicitor chiefly known for his representation of the family of Stephen Lawrence during the public inquiry into the murder of Stephen Lawrence.

Imran was awarded the rank of Queen's Counsel in 2018.

Biography
Khan was born in Pakistan in 1964 and moved from Pakistan to London in 1968 when he was nearly four years old. He grew up in Upton Park in East London. He attended Lister Community School in Plaistow and studied law at the University of East London, then known as the North East London Polytechnic, graduating in 1987.

He had been working as a lawyer for 18 months when he took on the Lawrence case.

References

External links
 Imran Khan and Partners Solicitors website
 Stephen Lawrence Inquiry (Macpherson Report)
 Guardian article on cuts to legal aid
 Lawrence solicitor is honoured for six-year battle for justice
 Telegraph article

1964 births
Living people
English solicitors
Alumni of the University of East London
Pakistani emigrants to the United Kingdom
People from Upton Park, London
21st-century King's Counsel
British lawyers of Pakistani descent
British republicans